Melanie Klaffner was the defending champion but lost in the first round to Tatia Mikadze. 
Alexandra Panova won the title by defeating Alexandra Cadanțu in the final 4–6, 6–1, 6–1.

Seeds

Draw

Finals

Top half

Bottom half

References
 Main Draw
 Qualifying Draw

Telavi Open - Singles
2011 in Georgian sport
Telavi Open